Mimomyia (Mimomyia) hybrida is a species of zoophilic mosquito belonging to the genus Mimomyia. It is found in Sri Lanka, Malaya, Singapore, Sumatra, Java, Borneo, Philippines, and Thailand.

References

External links
Mimomyia Theobald, 1903 - Mosquito Taxonomic Inventory
Pupa of ficalbia (mimomyia) chamberlaini (Ludlow) (Diptera : Culicidae) 1974
Species in tribes Ficalbiini, Hodgesiini and Orthopodomyiini with published illustrations and/or descriptions of eggs (Diptera: Culicidae)
Notes on the feeding and egg-laying habits of Ficalbia (Mimomyia) chamberlaini, Ludlow 1904. (Diptera, Culicidae.).
PHYSICO-CHEMICAL CHARACTERISTICS OF MOSQUITO BREEDING HABITATS IN AN IRRIGATION DEVELOPMENT AREA IN SRI LANKA

hybrida